Medical Physics is a monthly peer reviewed scientific journal covering research on medical physics. The first issue was published in January 1974. Medical Physics is an official journal of the American Association of Physicists in Medicine, the Canadian Organization of Medical Physicists, the Canadian College of Physicists in Medicine and the International Organization for Medical Physics.

Abstracting and indexing
Medical Physics is indexed in:
  Chemical Abstracts Service
 Index Medicus/MEDLINE/PubMed
 Scopus

According to the Journal Citation Reports, the journal has a 2021 impact factor of 4.506, ranking it 44th out of 136 journals in the category "Radiology, Nuclear Medicine & Medical Imaging".

References

External links
Official website

Medical physics journals
American Institute of Physics academic journals
Publications established in 1974
English-language journals
Monthly journals